Mark Lebedew (born 6 May 1967) is an Australian professional volleyball coach. He is the current head coach of VfB Friedrichshafen.

Career as coach

Clubs
In 2010, Lebedew took charge of Berlin Recycling Volleys, with whom he won three German Champion titles, in 2012, 2013 and 2014. In 2015, he led Berlin Recycling Volleys to the CEV Champions League bronze medal after defeating PGE Skra Bełchatów in a third place match (3–2). In 2015, he moved to Poland and led his team, Jastrzębski Węgiel, to the PlusLiga bronze medal in 2017. In 2018, he signed a contract with Warta Zawiercie. He finished in fourth place in the 2018–19 PlusLiga season, the highest ever finish in club's history.

National teams
In 2017, Lebedew was appointed new head coach of the Australia national team. In January 2020, he resigned his post after missing qualifying for the Tokyo Olympic Games at the Asian Qualifying Tournament held in China.

In February 2022, he took charge of the Slovenia national team. He was dismissed in August 2022, after failing to reach the top 8 in the 2022 Nations League.

Honours

Club
 2011–12  German Championship, with Berlin Recycling Volleys
 2012–13  German Championship, with Berlin Recycling Volleys
 2013–14  German Championship, with Berlin Recycling Volleys
 2021–22  German Cup, with VfB Friedrichshafen

References

External links

 
 Coach profile at Volleybox.net

1967 births
Living people
Naturalized citizens of Poland
Sportspeople from Adelaide
Australian volleyball coaches
Volleyball coaches of international teams
Australian expatriate sportspeople in Germany
Australian expatriate sportspeople in Belgium
Australian expatriate sportspeople in Italy
Australian expatriate sportspeople in Poland
Jastrzębski Węgiel coaches
Warta Zawiercie coaches
Gwardia Wrocław coaches